The parotid plexus or plexus parotideus is the branch point of the facial nerve (extratemporal) after it leaves the stylomastoid foramen. This division takes place within the parotid gland.

Branches
Commonly, it divides into the following branches (several variations):

The temporal branches, cross the zygomatic arch to the temporal region.
The zygomatic branches, cross the zygomatic bone to the orbit.
The buccal branches, pass forward to below the orbit and around the mouth.
The marginal mandibular branch passes forward to the lower lip and chin.
The cervical branch runs forward forming a series of arches over the suprahyoid region to the platysma muscle.

References

External links
 http://www.dartmouth.edu/~humananatomy/figures/chapter_47/47-5.HTM
 

Nerves